Murder by Rope is a 1936 British mystery film directed by George Pearson and starring Constance Godridge, D. A. Clarke-Smith and Sunday Wilshin.

Cast
 Constance Godridge as Daphne Farrow  
 D. A. Clarke-Smith as Hanson  
 Sunday Wilshin as Lucille Davine  
 Wilfrid Hyde-White as Alastair Dane 
 Donald Read as Peter Paxton  
 Daphne Courtney as Flora  
 Dorothy Hamilton as Mrs. Mulcaire  
 Guy Belmore as Simpson  
 Philip Hewland as Judge Paxton 
 Graham Cheswright as Jury foreman  
 Charles Barrett
 William Collins
 Alban Conway

References

Bibliography
 Low, Rachael. Filmmaking in 1930s Britain. George Allen & Unwin, 1985.
 Wood, Linda. British Films, 1927-1939. British Film Institute, 1986.

External links

1936 films
1930s English-language films
1936 mystery films
British mystery films
Films shot at Shepperton Studios
Films set in England
British black-and-white films
British and Dominions Studios films
Quota quickies
Films set in London
1930s British films